The Albania national football team was first established in 1930 following the creation of Albanian Football Association on the same year. The first ever manager of the team was Ljubiša Broćić who guided Albania in the first international matches in 1946. Since then, 27 other managers have been in charge of Albania, with Gianni De Biasi being more successful, leading the team to their second ever UEFA European Championship participation in 2016 after the Euros in 1964. The current manager of the Albania national team is former Italian international Christian Panucci who replaced fellow countryman Gianni De Biasi in July 2017.

List of managers

This is a chronological list of the managers who have guided Albania since 1946.

References

External links

 
Albania
football team managers